Closterotomus fulvomaculatus is a species of plant bugs of the family Miridae, subfamily Mirinae.

Description
By July, it becomes an adult.

Distribution
It is mainly absent from Andorra, Azores, Canary Islands, Cyprus, Faroe Islands, Iceland, Ireland, Madeira, Malta and northwestern part of Russia.

Ecology
Closterotomus fulvomaculatus lay eggs in the cracks of wooden stems in late July and August. They feed on various fruit crops including Trifolium, Urtica and various plants from family Asteraceae which includes Anthemis, Carduus, Cirsium and Matricaria'' species.

References

External links
Closterotomus fulvomaculatus
Image of a nymph

Insects described in 1773
Hemiptera of Europe
Mirini
Taxa named by Charles De Geer